The Cyprus national badminton team represents Cyprus in international badminton team competitions. The national team trains in Strovolos, where the nation's governing body for badminton, the Cyprus Badminton Federation (CBF) is located. Cyprus competed in the Sudirman Cup from 1993 to 2007. 

The Cypriot national team also competed in the now defunct Helvetia Cup. The team also competes in the Mediterranean Games and won their first badminton medal in the Games. The men's and women's team only competed once in the European Men's and Women's Team Badminton Championships.

Participation in BWF competitions

Sudirman Cup

Participation in European Team Badminton Championships

Men's Team

Women's Team

Mixed Team

Participation in Helvetia Cup

Participation in European Junior Team Badminton Championships
Mixed Team

Current squad 

Male players
Christos Georgiou
Constantinos Symeonides
Elias Nicolaou
Iakovos Acheriotis
Ioannis Tambourlas
Michalis Fyrillas
Nikolas Kokolas
Orestis Pissis
Panayiotis Adamou
Christos Hailis
Andreas Theodotou
Antonis Antoniou
Aris Kattirtzi

Female players
Anthia Athinodorou
Chara Michael
Eleni Christodoulou
Eva Kattirtzi
Ioanna Alexandrou
Ioanna Antoniou
Ioanna Pissi
Maria Eleni Aristapoulou
Marisa Fyrilla

References

Badminton
National badminton teams
Badminton in Cyprus